The subdivisions of England constitute a hierarchy of administrative divisions and non-administrative ceremonial areas.

Overall, England is divided into nine regions and 48 ceremonial counties, although these have only a limited role in public policy. For the purposes of local government, the country is divided into counties, districts and parishes. In some areas, counties and districts form a two-tier administrative structure, while in others they are combined under a unitary authority. Parishes cover only part of England.

The current system is the result of incremental reform which has its origins in legislation enacted in 1965 and 1972.

Regions 
At the highest level, all of England is divided into nine regions that are each made up of a number of counties and districts. These 'government office regions' were created in 1994, and from the 1999 Euro-elections up until the UK's exit from the EU, they were used as the European Parliament constituencies in the United Kingdom and in England's European Parliament constituencies.

The regions vary greatly in their areas covered, populations and contributions to the national economy. All have the same status, except London which has substantive devolved powers.

There was a failed attempt to create elected regional assemblies outside London in 2004 and since then the structures of regional governance (regional assemblies, regional development agencies and local authority leaders' boards) have been subject to review.  Following the change of government in 2010, these were scheduled for abolition by 2012.

Local government subdivisions 

England has a non-universal structure of local government subdivisions. There are two tiers of local government subdivision - (administrative) counties and districts (known as boroughs in London).

Different local authorities exist across England:

 county council
 district council
 unitary authority
 metropolitan district
 London borough

Unitary authorities 
Outside London and the metropolitan counties, some parts of England are governed by a single council, commonly called (but not named in statute) as a unitary authority. As of February 2022, there are 58 unitary authorities. Unitary authorities are a combined non-metropolitan county and non-metropolitan district, undertaking the functions of both. Unitary authorities can additionally have the status of borough or city, although this has no effect on their powers or functions.

There is a general push towards the reorganisation of English local government as unitary authorities. Often reorganisation is a condition of the devolution of new powers.

46 unitary authorities were created between 1995 and 1998 and nine more were created in 2009, followed by further changes in 2019, 2020 and 2021. They were formed either by non-metropolitan districts taking on county-level functions, or by counties taking on district-level functions. In some cases, borders were altered or districts were combined during this reorganisation. Berkshire is an anomaly in this arrangement whereby its districts became unitary authorities, but the non-metropolitan county was not formally abolished.

For ceremonial purposes, unitary authorities are considered to be part of the county to which they formerly belonged.  Politically, however, they are fully independent entities, unaffiliated with the council of their former county.  For instance, the unitary authority of Plymouth is traditionally considered part of Devon, though politically it is not part of the county.  In the case of Berkshire, there is no county council, as all of its former territory is now covered by six unitary authorities, unaffiliated with each other politically.  Although there is no county council in Berkshire, these six unitary authorities comprise the ceremonial county of Berkshire.

Isles of Scilly 
The Isles of Scilly are governed by a sui generis local authority called the Council of the Isles of Scilly. The authority was established in 1890 as the Isles of Scilly Rural District Council. It was renamed but otherwise unreformed by the changes in local government that occurred in 1974 in the rest of England outside Greater London. Although effectively a unitary authority, for example it is an education authority, the Isles of Scilly are part of the Cornwall ceremonial county and combine with Cornwall Council for services such as health and economic development.

Two-tier counties 
Most of the geographical area of England is within a two-tier non-metropolitan arrangement. In 24 of these areas the county councils provide the majority of services, including education and social services, and the 181 district councils have a more limited role. Non-metropolitan districts can additionally have the status of borough or city, although this has no effect on their powers or functions. Every two-tier non-metropolitan county forms either the whole or a part of a ceremonial county of the same name. Berkshire is an anomaly in this arrangement whereby its districts are unitary authorities, but the non-metropolitan county was not formally abolished and it is also a ceremonial county. Bedfordshire, Cheshire and Northamptonshire are three former non-metropolitan counties that continue to exist only as ceremonial counties.

Metropolitan counties 
Six large conurbations of England correspond to metropolitan counties. Each metropolitan county had a county council providing limited strategic services, such as public transport and planning, from 1974 to 1986. Despite no longer having county councils the metropolitan counties still legally exist, and are each a ceremonial county. County-level functions, such as public transport, are exercised by joint-boards and other arrangements organised by the district councils. In the metropolitan counties, the 36 district councils operate effectively as unitary authorities and provide the majority of services, including education and social services. All metropolitan districts additionally have the status of borough, and some are cities, although this has no effect on their powers or functions. From April 2011 there has been a formal upper-tier structure in Greater Manchester with the creation of the Greater Manchester Combined Authority.

London
The Greater London administrative area created in 1965 corresponds to the London region. Through incremental change, culminating in 2000, the upper-tier authority is the Greater London Authority, comprising an elected Mayor of London and the London Assembly, the successors to the earlier Greater London Council, which existed from 1965 until 1986. Greater London is divided into 32 London boroughs, also dating from 1965, each governed by a London borough council. The ancient City of London forms a 33rd division and is governed by the City of London Corporation, a sui generis authority unlike any other in England that has largely avoided any of the reforms of local government in the 19th and 20th centuries. The City of London, and the rest of Greater London, each form a ceremonial county. The London borough councils and the City of London Corporation provide the majority of services, for example they are education authorities and co-ordinate waste management, whereas the Greater London Authority is responsible for the key strategic services of public transport, the police outside the City, economic development and emergency planning.

Ceremonial and historic counties 
For non-administrative purposes, England is wholly divided into 48 counties, commonly known, but not named in statute, as ceremonial counties. These counties are used for the purposes of appointing Lords Lieutenant who are historically the Crown's representatives in those areas. Ceremonial counties are often different from the metropolitan and non-metropolitan counties used for local government as they include the areas covered by unitary authorities. They are taken into consideration when drawing up Parliamentary constituency boundaries.

Civil parishes 

The civil parish is the most local unit of government in England. A parish is governed by a parish council or parish meeting, which exercises a limited number of functions that would otherwise be delivered by the local authority. There is one civil parish in Greater London (Queen's Park, in the City of Westminster), and not all of the rest of England is parished. The number of parishes and total area parished is growing.

Lists of subdivisions

Regions

Two-tier non-metropolitan counties

Metropolitan counties

London

Unitary authorities

Civil parishes
List of civil parishes in England

Hierarchical list of regions, counties and districts

See also 
Combined authority

Notes 

  Also a ceremonial county of identical area.
  Also a ceremonial county covering a larger area.
  Cumbria, Hertfordshire, Norfolk, Northamptonshire, Oxfordshire, Suffolk, Surrey, Warwickshire, West Sussex and Worcestershire occupy the same area as the ceremonial county; Buckinghamshire, Cambridgeshire, Derbyshire, Devon, Dorset, East Sussex, Essex, Gloucestershire, Hampshire, Kent, Lancashire, Leicestershire, Lincolnshire, North Yorkshire, Nottinghamshire, Somerset and Staffordshire are larger for ceremonial purposes, being combined with one or more unitary authorities.
  Metropolitan (36); non-metropolitan two-tier (181); unitary authority (58); London borough (32); sui generis (2).
  Berkshire has no county council and the districts function as unitary authorities.

References

External links 

Map of the UK counties and unitary administrations 
Map of all UK local authorities